For Django is an album by jazz guitarist Joe Pass that contains renditions of compositions famously interpreted by, written about or written for Django Reinhardt.

Reception

In his Allmusic review, critic Scott Yanow wrote that the album was long considered a classic and that "Although Pass was actually more strongly influenced by Charlie Christian than by Reinhardt and he had already formed his own style, he has no difficulty fitting into the music."

Track listing
"Django" (John Lewis) – 3:22
"Rosetta" (Earl Hines, Henri Woode) – 3:07
"Nuages" (Django Reinhardt, Jacques Larue) – 2:35
"For Django" (Pass) – 2:55
"Night and Day" (Cole Porter) – 3:46
"Fleur d'Ennui" (Reinhardt) – 2:57
"Insensiblement" (Paul Misraki) – 3:14
"Cavalerie" (Reinhardt) – 4:26
"Django's Castle" (Reinhardt) – 3:49
"Limehouse Blues" (Douglas Furber, Philip Braham) – 2:14

Personnel
 Joe Pass – guitar
 John Pisano – guitar
 Jim Hughart – bass
 Colin Bailey – drums

Charts

References

1964 albums
Joe Pass albums
Pacific Jazz Records albums